Parascopodes cyaneus is a species of beetle in the family Carabidae, the only species in the genus Parascopodes.

References

Lebiinae